Mohsen Sadr (also known by his title: Sadr ol-Ashraf [II]) (1871 – 19 October 1962) was a judge and politician, the prime minister of Iran and the president of the Senate of Iran. During his government, Iran became one of the founding states of the United Nations by signing the Charter of the United Nations.

Life and politics
He was born in Mahallat in Markazi in 1871 as the son of Seyyed Hossein 'Fakhr ol-Zakerin', a wealthy clergyman, by a daughter of Hajji Molla Akbar Khorassani. He received his title "Sadr ol-Ashraf' after the death of his paternal uncle Seyyed Sadr ed-Din 'Sadr ol-Ashraf', who had been the son-in-law of the very influential courtier Anoushirvan (Shir) Khan Qajar Qovanlou 'Eyn ol-Molk' 'Etezad od-Doleh' (a cousin of Nasser ed-Din Shah). Mohsen 'Sadr ol-Ashraf' served as royal tutor to one of Nasereddin Shah's sons, and served in many senior government positions in his career, such as President of the High Court of Justice in Tehran, Governor of Khorasan, Speaker of Majlis, Minister of The Judiciary (five times), Prime Minister in 1945 and Senator (twice). After the death of Prince Abdol-Hossein Mirza Farmanfarma in 1939 he acted as the executor of the last will of Farmanfarma and guardian of his children.

Death
Mohsen Sadr died in Tehran of brain cancer on 19 October 1962 at the age of 91. He had three sons and seven daughters. His first child was "Abul Qasem Sadr". Hossein Eslambolchi, an Iranian-American experimental physicist and engineer, is the grandson of Abul Qasem Sadr and the great grandchild of Mohsen Sadr.<ref>[https://www.ketablazem.com/product/%D8%AE%D8%A7%D8%B7%D8%B1%D8%A7%D8%AA-%D8%B5%D8%AF%D8%B1%D8%A7%D9%84%D8%A7%D8%B4%D8%B1%D8%A7%D9%81-%D9%86%D9%88%D8%B4%D8%AA%D9%87-%D9%85%D8%AD%D8%B3%D9%86-%D8%B5%D8%AF%D8%B1/صدر، محسن. خاطرات صدرالاشراف'] انتشارات وحید، ۱۳۶۴</ref>

See also
 Pahlavi dynasty
 List of prime ministers of Iran
 List of Iranian senators

References

External links

'Alí Rizā Awsatí, Iran in the Past Three Centuries (Irān dar Se Qarn-e Goz̲ashteh), Volumes 1 and 2 (Paktāb Publishing , Tehran, Iran, 2003).  (Vol. 1),  (Vol. 2).
L.A. Ferydoun Barjesteh van Waalwijk van Doorn, "Mistaken Identities: Anoushirvan (Shir) Khan (Qajar Qovanlou) Eyn ol-Molk Etezad od-Doleh and Prince Ali Qoli Mirza Etezad os-Saltaneh," in: Qajar Studies II, Journal of the International Qajar Studies Association, Rotterdam/Santa Barbara/Tehran 2002, pp. 91-150. ''

People from Markazi Province
1871 births
1962 deaths
Prime Ministers of Iran
Presidents of the Senate of Iran
Deaths from cancer in Iran
Deaths from brain tumor
People from Mahallat
Ministers of Justice of Iran
19th-century Iranian politicians
20th-century Iranian politicians